The 2020–21 Cupa României preliminary rounds make up the qualifying competition to decide which teams take part in the main competition from first round . This is the 83rd season of the most prestigious football cup competition of Romania.

The qualifying rounds took place between August 2019 and June 2020.

First round

Alba 

These matches played on 25 August 2019.
First-round results: Alba

 CS Arieșul Apuseni Baia de Arieș qualified direct in 2nd Round.

Arad 

These matches played on 10 and 11 August 2019.
First-round results: Arad

Argeș 

These matches played on 19 September 2019.
First-round results: Argeș

Bacău 

These matches played on 22–23 February 2020.
First-round results: Bacău

  Note 1 - (result decided at the "green table" - the players of the team from Bacău did not have the medical visa applied on the identification cards).
 Did not play in this round: FC Dinamo Bacău, AS Voinţa Gârleni, AS Filipești, AFCS Viitorul Curița, AS Voința Oituz, AS Vulturul Măgirești.
Qualified direct in 2nd Round: CS Faraoani, ACS Viitorul Nicolae Bălcescu, ACS Gloria Zemeș.

Bihor 

These matches played on 10–11 August 2019.
First-round results: Bihor

From 5th League, Serie 1 qualified direct in 2nd Round: Voinţa Suplac, Cetatea Biharia, ACS CAO 1910 Oradea, Locadin Ţeţchea, ACS Slovan Valea Cerului.
From 5th League, Serie 2 qualified direct in 2nd Round: Unirea Roşia, AS Zorile Buntești, Biharea Marmogranit Vaşcău, Viitorul Tărian, Vida Pomezeu.

Bistrița-Năsăud 

These matches played on 5 April 2020.
First-round results: Bistrița-Năsăud

Botoșani 

These matches played on 3 November 2019.
First-round results: Botoșani

Brașov

Brașov zone

These matches is preliminary rounds for matches with teams from 4th League and was played on 25 August 2019.
First-round results: Brașov zone

Făgăraș zone

These matches is preliminary rounds for matches with teams from 4th League and was played on 25 August 2019.
First-round results: Făgăraș zone East Serie

These matches is preliminary rounds for matches with teams from 4th League and was played on 25 and 28 August 2019.
First-round results: Făgăraș zone West Serie

Brăila 

These matches played on 17 and 18 August 2019.
First-round results: Brăila

Bucharest 

These matches played on 17 September 2019.
First-round results: Bucharest

Buzău 

These matches played on 1 September 2019.
First-round results: Buzău

Caraș-Severin 

These matches played on 8 September 2019.
First-round results: Caraș-Severin

Călărași 

These matches played on 27 and 28 July 2019.
First-round results: Călărași

 ACS Zarea Cuza Vodă (5-Serie B) walkover.
 AS Avântul Luica (5-Serie A) walkover.
 AS Rapid Ulmeni (5-Serie A) walkover.
 Rapid Răzvani (5-Serie A) walkover.

Cluj

Cluj zone

These matches is preliminary rounds for matches with teams from 4th League and was played on 18 and 19 September 2019.
First-round results: Cluj zone

Dej zone

These matches is preliminary rounds for matches with teams from 4th League and was played on 24 and 25 August 2019.
First-round results: Dej zone

Mociu zone

These matches is preliminary rounds for matches with teams from 4th League and was played on 4 August 2019.
First-round results: Mociu zone

Second round

Alba 

These matches played on 22 September 2019.
Second Round Results: Alba

 AS Hidromecanica Șugag qualified direct in 3rd Round.

Arad 

These matches played on 28 August 2019.
Second Round Results: Arad

Argeș 

These matches played on 17 October 2019.
Second Round Results: Argeș

 ACS Oarja (5-Center) is qualified direct in Third Round.
 ACS Steaua Negrași (5-South) is qualified direct in Third Round.
 FC Star Sport Argeș SA (5-Center) is qualified direct in Third Round.
 AS Șoimii Tigveni (5-Center) is qualified direct in Third Round.
 AS Lerești (5-North) is qualified direct in Third Round.

Bacău 

These matches played on 29 February-1 March 2020.
Second Round Results: Bacău

 AS Voinţa Oituz did not show up at the match.
 AFCS Viitorul Curiţa qualified direct in 3rd Round.

Bihor 

These matches played on 15–18 August 2019.
Second Round Results: Bihor

Botoșani 

These matches played on 17 November 2019.
Second Round Results: Botoșani

Brașov

Brașov zone

These matches is preliminary rounds for matches with teams from 4th League and was played on 1 September 2019.
Second Round Results: Brașov zone

Făgăraș zone

These matches is preliminary rounds for matches with teams from 4th League and was played on 4 and 5 September 2019.
Second Round Results: Făgăraș zone East Serie

These matches is preliminary rounds for matches with teams from 4th League and was played on 4 September 2019.
Second Round Results: Făgăraș zone West Serie

Brăila 

These matches played on 24 and 25 August 2019.
Second Round Results: Brăila

Bucharest 

These matches played on 15 October 2019.
Second Round Results: Bucharest

Buzău 

These matches played on 24, 25 and 27 September 2019.
Second Round Results: Buzău

Caraș-Severin 

These matches played on 9 October 2019.
Second Round Results: Caraș-Severin

Călărași 

These matches played on 18 and 25 September 2019.
Second Round Results: Călărași

 AS Colinele Argeșului Mitreni (5-Serie A)) walkover.
 AS Avântul Dor Mărunt (5-Serie B) walkover.
 AS Lumina Frumușani (4) walkover.
 AFC Steaua Radovanu (4) walkover.

Third round

Alba 

These matches played on 16 October 2019.
Third Round Results: Alba

Arad 

These matches played on 18 September 2019.
Third Round Results: Arad

Argeș 

These matches played on 17 October 2019.
Third Round Results: Argeș

 CS Rucar did not present the players' cards.

Bihor 

These matches played on 4 September 2019.
Third Round Results: Bihor

Botoșani 

These matches played on 23 November and 1 December 2019.
Third Round Results: Botoșani

Brașov

Brașov zone

These matches is preliminary rounds for matches with teams from 4th League and was played on 2 October 2019.
Third Round Results: Brașov zone

Făgăraș zone

These matches is preliminary rounds for matches with teams from 4th League and was played on 19 September 2019.
Third Round Results: Făgăraș zone East Serie

These matches is preliminary rounds for matches with teams from 4th League and was played on 18 September 2019.
Third Round Results: Făgăraș zone West Serie

Brăila 

These matches will be played in 2020.
Third Round Results: Brăila

Bucharest 

These matches played on 3 December 2019.
Third Round Results: Bucharest

Buzău 

These matches will played in 2020.
Third Round Results: Buzău

Caraș-Severin 

These matches played on 6 November 2019 and 8 March 2020.
Third Round Results: Caraș-Severin

Călărași 

These matches played on 7 December 2019.
Third Round Results: Călărași

Fourth round

Alba 

These matches played in 2020.
Fourth Round Results: Alba

Argeș 

These matches played in 2020.
Fourth Round Results: Argeș

Bihor 

These matches played on 25 September 2019.
Fourth Round Results: Bihor

Botoșani 

These matches played in 2020.
Fourth Round Results: Botoșani

Brașov

Făgăraș zone

These matches is preliminary rounds for matches with teams from 4th League and was played on 10 October 2019.
Fourth Round Results: Făgăraș zone East Serie

These matches is preliminary rounds for matches with teams from 4th League and was played on 9 October 2019.
Fourth Round Results: Făgăraș zone West Serie

Călărași 

These matches will be played in 2020.
Fourth Round Results: Călărași

Fifth round

Brașov
Also was one preliminary tour with teams and was played on 23 October 2019.
Preliminary Tour Results: Brașov & Făgăraș zone vs 4th League

Fifth Round will take place in 2020.
Fifth Round Results: Brașov

References

Preliminary Rounds